Newman is a city in Stanislaus County, California, located in the San Joaquin Valley region of the greater Central Valley. The city had a population of 10,224 at the 2010 census, up from 7,093 at the 2000 census. Founded in 1888 by Simon Newman, the city is a largely agricultural community, known for its annual Fall Festival.

History

Simon Newman was born as Simon Neumann in Willmars, Bavaria, German Confederation in 1846. In 1862, the young Jew decided to emigrate to California, where his sister Fanny Wangenheim already lived. Initially speaking only German and Hebrew he learned English and translated his family name to Newman. After becoming a successful businessman he founded the town of Newman in 1888.

Geography

Newman is located at  (37.315038, −121.022476)
Newman currently has over 10,000 people. Newman is located on California State Route 33 between the towns of Gustine and Crows Landing. Interstate 5 is located a few miles to the west of the city.

Climate

Newman has a semi-arid climate (Köppen: BSh) with Mediterranean influences, characterized by hot, dry summers and cool winters.

Demographics

2010
At the 2010 census Newman had a population of 10,224. The racial makeup of Newman was 6,812 (66.6%) White, 234 (2.3%) African American, 106 (1.0%) Native American, 191 (1.9%) Asian, 40 (0.4%) Pacific Islander, 2,287 (22.4%) from other races, and 554 (5.4%) from two or more races. Hispanic or Latino of any race were 6,299 persons (61.6%).

The census reported that 10,158 people (99.4% of the population) lived in households, no one lived in non-institutionalized group quarters and 66 (0.6%) were institutionalized.

There were 3,006 households, 1,581 (52.6%) had children under the age of 18 living in them, 1,818 (60.5%) were opposite-sex married couples living together, 400 (13.3%) had a female householder with no husband present, 214 (7.1%) had a male householder with no wife present.  There were 232 (7.7%) unmarried opposite-sex partnerships, and 16 (0.5%) same-sex married couples or partnerships. 466 households (15.5%) were one person and 174 (5.8%) had someone living alone who was 65 or older. The average household size was 3.38.  There were 2,432 families (80.9% of households); the average family size was 3.75.

The age distribution was 3,317 people (32.4%) under the age of 18, 1,015 people (9.9%) aged 18 to 24, 2,773 people (27.1%) aged 25 to 44, 2,250 people (22.0%) aged 45 to 64, and 869 people (8.5%) who were 65 or older.  The median age was 30.7 years. For every 100 females, there were 97.9 males.  For every 100 females age 18 and over, there were 96.8 males.

There were 3,357 housing units at an average density of 1,597.2 per square mile, of the occupied units 2,002 (66.6%) were owner-occupied and 1,004 (33.4%) were rented. The homeowner vacancy rate was 5.9%; the rental vacancy rate was 6.9%.  6,685 people (65.4% of the population) lived in owner-occupied housing units and 3,473 people (34.0%) lived in rental housing units.

2000

At the 2000 census there were 7,093 people in 2,079 households, including 1,700 families, in the city. The racial makeup of the city was 60.76% White, 1.25% African American, 1.33% Native American, 1.85% Asian, 0.07% Pacific Islander, 28.92% from other races, and 5.82% from two or more races. Hispanic or Latino of any race were 51.43%.

Of the 2,079 households 50.4% had children under the age of 18 living with them, 63.7% were married couples living together, 12.1% had a female householder with no husband present, and 18.2% were non-families. 14.6% of households were one person and 7.3% were one person aged 65 or older.  The average household size was 3.38 and the average family size was 3.74.

The age distribution was 35.3% under the age of 18, 9.5% from 18 to 24, 29.7% from 25 to 44, 16.7% from 45 to 64, and 8.8% 65 or older.  The median age was 29 years. For every 100 females, there were 100.9 males.  For every 100 females age 18 and over, there were 98.5 males.

The median household income was $39,460 and the median family income  was $42,523. Males had a median income of $36,352 versus $25,230 for females. The per capita income for the city was $14,781.  About 10.0% of families and 13.1% of the population were below the poverty line, including 14.7% of those under age 18 and 10.9% of those age 65 or over.

Government

The city is under a mandate from the county's Local Agency Formation Commission to adopt an agricultural land preservation strategy. The city could approve an urban growth limit policy that would establish the sphere of influence boundary lasting for 25 years.

References

External links
 Official website

Cities in Stanislaus County, California
Incorporated cities and towns in California